Viimne reliikvia (Estonian for The Last Relic) is a 1969 Estonian-language Soviet film based on Vürst Gabriel ehk Pirita kloostri viimsed päevad (Estonian for Prince Gabriel or The Last Days of Pirita Monastery), a historical novel by Eduard Bornhöhe.  The film became extremely popular, and some critics consider it the only Estonian cult film.

Content editor was later president of Estonia Lennart Meri

Setting 
The movie is set during a Livonian War era peasant uprising.  A central plot device is the Pirita monastery, a real monastery dedicated to St. Brigitta.  Currently, the monastery's original medieval buildings lie in ruins and are kept that way as a museum, but an organisational structure, complete with nuns, was restored after the end of Soviet occupation.

Movie sets 
Scenes for the movie were recorded in Tallinn Old Town, passages of the Dominican monastery of Tallinn, Taevaskoja, as well as other places.  A mock monastery was built in Kukerand, near Virtsu.  Several outdoors scenes were taken in Latvia, near the Gauja river.  Indoors scenes were, among other places, taken in the fortress of Kuressaare and the Tallinn church of St. Nicholas.

Success 
A typical live action movie of the era had a standardised budget of 350,000 roubles.  As a special case, the team of Viimne reliikvia managed to haggle themselves a budget of 750,000 roubles — more than double the customary.  This lavishness paid off very well, as within the very first year, 772,000 tickets were sold in Estonia only.  (Remarkably, Estonia's population at that time was around 1,300,000.) The movie set the absolute box office record for the entire Soviet Union in 1971 by selling 44.9 million tickets. It was distributed by the Soviet film export internationally in more than 60 countries.

Russian version 
A Russian language version was dubbed by the Mosfilm studio. It is 89 minutes in length.

Digital 
In 2000, the Estonian Film Foundation and Tallinnfilm determined Viimne reliikvia to be an important part of Estonian cultural heritage, and in order to preserve it, undertook a digital remastering.  This became the first digitally remastered Estonian movie; others followed.

The digital copy was re-launched on 15 March 2002, and again, became a bestseller.  As of 2007, the remastered movie is available on DVD.

Cultural influence 
The movie became extremely influential, and as such, has been repeatedly lampooned.  As one notable example, in 1992, during the early capitalism developing in the aftermath of perestroika, Ivar Vigla prepared a brief parody for Wigla Show, featuring quotes such as "We don't get paid for chitchat" and "What will become of us? — A joint venture."  Many of these parody quotes became independently popular, and then, in turn, became lampooned in other venues, such as the Ugala Theatre's production of The Love for Three Oranges.  Also, several parodies of the movie's songs have been circulated in the Internet.

Cast
Aleksandr Goloborodko as Gabriel (Estonian voice: Mati Klooren)
Ingrīda Andriņa as Agnes von Mönnikhusen (Estonian voice: Mare Garšnek)
Elza Radziņa as Abtiss (Estonian voice: Aino Talvi)
Rolan Bykov as Brother Johannes (Estonian voice: Jüri Järvet)
Eve Kivi as Ursula 
 as Siim (Estonian voice: Aksel Orav)
Raivo Trass  as Hans von Risbieter 
Peeter Jakobi as Ivo Schenkenberg (Estonian voice: Olev Eskola)
Karl Kalkun as Rebel Leader
 as Johann von Risbieter
Jüri Uppin as Delvig
Helmut Vaag as Innkeeper
Katrin Karisma as Chambermaid
 as Priest in the monastery
Priit Pärn as Insurgent
Ants Lauter as Elder
Hans Kaldoja as Monk
 as Monk
Hugo Laur as Monk
Kalju Komissarov as Monk
Feliks Kark as Robber
Valdo Truve as Robber
 as Lute player

Vocals: Estonian: Peeter Tooma (:et), Russian: Georg Ots

References

External links 
 

Soviet-era Estonian films
1960s historical action films
Soviet historical action films
1969 films
Estonian action films
Estonian-language films
Films set in the 16th century
Films set in Estonia
Films shot in Estonia
Estonian novels adapted into films
Films based on Estonian novels
Tallinnfilm films